Ebenezer Young (December 25, 1783 – August 18, 1851) was a United States representative from Connecticut. He was born in Killingly, Connecticut and graduated from Yale College in 1806. He studied law and was admitted to the bar and commenced practice in Danielson, Connecticut. In addition, he engaged in the manufacture of cloth at East Killingly, Connecticut.

Young was elected as a Federalist to the Connecticut House of Representatives in 1810, 1811, 1816, and 1817. He served in the Connecticut Senate 1823–1825 and was again a member of the Connecticut House of Representatives 1826–1828, serving as speaker in 1827 and 1828. He was elected to the Twenty-first, Twenty-second, and Twenty-third Congresses (March 4, 1829 – March 3, 1835) and served as chairman, Committee on Expenditures on Public Buildings (Twenty-second Congress). He died in West Killingly, Connecticut in 1851 and was buried in Westfield Cemetery, Danielson, Connecticut.

References

1783 births
1851 deaths
People from Killingly, Connecticut
Connecticut Federalists
Yale College alumni
Speakers of the Connecticut House of Representatives
National Republican Party members of the United States House of Representatives from Connecticut
19th-century American politicians